Hypertrocta is a genus of moths of the family Erebidae. The genus was erected by George Hampson in 1893.

Species
 Hypertrocta brunnea Bethune-Baker, 1908
 Hypertrocta posticalis Walker, [1866]

References

Hypeninae
Moth genera